Omeljan Yosypovych Pritsak (7 April 1919, Luka, Sambir County, West Ukrainian People's Republic – 29 May 2006, Boston) was the first Mykhailo Hrushevsky Professor of Ukrainian History at Harvard University and the founder and first director (1973–1989) of the Harvard Ukrainian Research Institute.

Career

From 1921 till 1936 he lived in Ternopil, where he graduated the state Polish gymnasium. Pritsak began his academic career at the University of Lviv in interwar Poland where he studied Middle Eastern languages under local orientalists and became associated with the Shevchenko Scientific Society and attended its seminar on Ukrainian history led by Ivan Krypiakevych. After the Soviet annexation of Galicia, he moved to Kyiv where he briefly studied with the premier Ukrainian orientalist, Ahatanhel Krymsky. During World War II, Pritsak was taken to the west as a Ostarbeiter. Following the war, he studied at the universities in Berlin and Göttingen, receiving a doctorate from the latter, before teaching at the University of Hamburg.

During his European period Pritsak initiated the establishment of the International Association of Ural – Altaic Studies. In 1958–1965 he served as its President and Editor-in-Chief of the Ural–Altaische Jahrbücher in 1954–1960.

In the 1960s, he moved to the United States, where he taught at the University of Washington for a while, before moving to Harvard at the invitation of the prominent linguist, Roman Jakobson, who was interested in proving the authenticity of the twelfth century "Song of Igor" through the use of oriental sources.

In 1973 he founded the Harvard Ukrainian Research Institute at Harvard. Two years later he became the first Mykhailo Hrushevsky Professor of Ukrainian History (1975). In 1977 he started the journal, Harvard Ukrainian Studies.

In 1988 he cofounded the International Association of Ukrainianists, established in Naples and became its Executive Board member and Head of Archeographic Commission.

In 1989, he retired from his Harvard professorship. After the emergence of an independent Ukraine in 1991, Pritsak returned to Kyiv where he founded the Oriental Institute of the National Academy of Sciences and became its first Director (since 1999 – Honorary Director). Also he re-established the journal Skhidnyi svit (The World of the Orient). Pritsak spent his final years back in the United States and died in Boston at the age of 87.

Main interests
Pritsak was a medievalist who specialized in the use of oriental, especially Turkic, sources for the history of Kyivan Rus', early modern Ukraine, and the European Steppe region. He was also a student of Old Norse and was familiar with Scandinavian sources for the history of Kyivan Rus'. His magnum opus, The Origin of Rus''', only one volume of which has appeared in English (1981), inclines toward, but does not totally adopt, a Normanist interpretation of Rus' origins. He saw Kyivan Rus' as a multi-ethnic polity.

In addition to the early Rus', Pritsak's works focused on Eurasian nomads and steppe empires such as those created by the Bulgars, Khazars, Pechenegs, and Kipchaks. However, he firmly rejected the "Eurasian" approach to Ukrainian and Russian history and would have nothing to do with its Russian nationalist postulates.

Ukrainian historian
Unlike his predecessors Mykhailo Hrushevsky, Dmytro Doroshenko, and Ivan Krypiakevych, who wrote national histories or histories of the Ukrainian people, Pritsak followed the Ukrainian historian of Polish background, Vyacheslav Lypynsky, in proposing the ideal of writing a "territorialist" history of Ukraine that would include the Polish, Turkic, and other peoples who have inhabited the country from ancient times. This idea was later taken up by his younger contemporary Paul Robert Magocsi, who was for some time an associate of the Harvard Ukrainian Institute.

Pritsak sought to improve quality and extent of Ukrainian studies at Harvard University. He supported establishing three different chairs for Ukrainian studies in the university: Ukrainian history, Ukrainian literature and Ukrainian philology.

 Omeljan Pritsak Research Center for Oriental Studies 
In 2009 Omeljan Pritsak Research Center for Oriental Studies named in honour of the Professor was founded in 2009. It is based on an extensive library and archive collection of Omeljan Pritsak, which he made a pledge to transfer to Kyiv-Mohyla Academy after his death. The heritage, collected by Omeljan Pritsak for 70 years contains manuscripts, printed editions, publications, historical sources, archival documents and artistic and cultural monuments on philosophy, linguistics, world history, Oriental Studies, Slavic Studies, Scandinavian Studies, archeology, numismatics, philosophy etc. Thus it was brought to the National University of Kyiv-Mohyla Academy in 2007. Research center as well as the library and the archive collection are now open to the public.

Politics
Pritsak was a political conservative and during his youth in eastern Galicia under the Polish Republic, and later also during the Cold War was a supporter of the conservative "Hetmanite" or monarchist movement among Ukrainians. This led him to criticize Hrushevsky's political radicalism and historical populism, although, ironically, he claimed that Hrushevsky's "school" of history was being continued at Harvard. Also during the Cold War, Pritsak became prominent in the movement towards Ukrainian-Jewish reconciliation. Pritsak often was invited to brief Pope John Paul II on developments in Central and Eastern Europe.

Published worksThe origins of the Old Rus' weights and monetary systems: Two studies in Western Eurasian metrology and numismatics in the seventh to eleventh centuries.  Cambridge, Massachusetts: Distributed by Harvard University Press for the Harvard Ukrainian Research Institute, 1998. From Kievan Rus' to modern Ukraine: Formation of the Ukrainian nation (with Mykhailo Hrushevski and John Stephen Reshetar). Cambridge, Massachusetts: Ukrainian Studies Fund, Harvard University, 1984.Khazarian Hebrew documents of the tenth century. (with Golb, Norman Ithaca: Cornell University Press, 1982.
"The Polovcians and Rus'" (Journal Article in Archivum Eurasiae medii aevi), 1982.The origin of Rus'.  Cambridge, Massachusetts: Distributed by Harvard University Press for the Harvard Ukrainian Research Institute, 1981.
Studies in medieval Eurasian history London: Variorum Reprints, 1981.On the writing of history in Kievan Rus. Cambridge, Massachusetts: Ukrainian Studies Fund, Harvard University, 1980.
"The Khazar Kingdom's Conversion to Judaism." (Journal Article in Harvard Ukrainian studies, 1978)
The Pechenegs: A Case of Social and Economic Transformation (Journal Article in Archivum Eurasiae medii aevi), 1975
"Two Migratory Movements in the Eurasian Steppe in the 9th-11th Centuries". (Conference Paper in Proceedings : Proceedings of the 26th International Congress of Orientalists, New Delhi 1964, Vol. 2)
The Decline of the Empire of the Oghuz Yabghu (Journal Article in Annals of the Ukrainian Academy of Arts and Sciences in the United States), 1952.
Die Bulgarische Fürstenliste, Wiesbaden 1955.

 References 

Further reading
 Keenan, Edward L. "Omeljan Pritsak (1919–2006): [Obituary]", Kritika: Explorations in Russian and Eurasian History, Vol. 7, No. 4. (2006), pp. 931–936.
 Oleksander Dombrovsky, "Pamiati Omeliana Pritsaka (Spohady)," [In Memory of Omeljan Pritsak: Recollections] Ukrainskyi istoryk, XLIII, 1-3 (2006), pp. 228–37 (in Ukrainian)
Omeljan Pritsak, noted Ukrainian studies scholar, dead at 87

 Thomas M. Prymak, "The Generation of 1919: Pritsak, Luckyj, and Rudnytsky," in The Ukrainian Weekly'' http://www.ukrweekly.com/uwwp/the-generation-of-1919-pritsak-luckyj-and-rudnytsky/ 

20th-century Ukrainian historians
Khazar studies
Soviet emigrants to the United States
Writers from Boston
University of Lviv alumni
Harvard University faculty
Members of the Shevchenko Scientific Society
Ukrainian orientalists
Ukrainian male writers
Historians of Ukraine
People from Lviv Oblast
1919 births
2006 deaths
Krymskyi Institute of Eastern Studies directors
Laureates of the State Prize of Ukraine in Science and Technology
Academic staff of the University of Hamburg
Recipients of the Order of Merit of the Republic of Turkey